Clay Dumaw is an American film director, screenwriter, editor and author, best known for independent films.

He directed Get Out Alive (2012), Hold'em (2014) and Jack Wyatt and the Gun from Hell (2021). He also wrote Stay the Course: How I Began a Career in Film, a memoir about his early life and career.

Early life 
Clay was born in Carthage, New York. He studied Visual Communications at the Charles H. Bohlen Technical Center.

Career 
Clay began his career as an editor and visual effects artist, creating title sequences for independent productions. He wrote and directed two feature films, Get Out Alive (2012) and Hold'em (2014), which earned official selections at the Snowtown International Film Festival and the Buffalo International Film Festival. He later worked on national ads for Honda, Toyota, Ford, United States Olympic & Paralympic Committee, Professional Bull Riders, United States Anti-Doping Agency, Pikes Peak International Hill Climb and Space Force.

His third film, Jack Wyatt and the Gun from Hell (2021), was shot entirely on a green screen in Colorado Springs, with computer generated environments added in post-production. Post-production on Jack Wyatt and the Gun from Hell spanned nearly two years. It earned multiple awards at film festivals worldwide.

Filmography

Awards and nominations

Books

References

External links 
 
 

21st-century American memoirists
21st-century American screenwriters
Film directors from New York (state)
Living people
Year of birth missing (living people)
People from Carthage, New York